P9 or P-9 may refer to:
 Planet Nine, a hypothetical new planet in the far outer solar system
 Boeing XP-9, a prototype fighter aircraft from the 1930s
 Heckler & Koch P9, a semi-automatic pistol
 Springfield Armory P9, a semi-automatic pistol
 Peruvian Airlines IATA airline designator
 P9 (band), a Brazilian boyband
 Power Nine, a trading cards game of Magic: The Gathering
 Psyclon Nine, an aggrotech band
 P-9 Project

See also
 9P (disambiguation)